Aq Bolagh-e Aqdaq (also Romanized as Āq Bolāgh-e Āqdāq; also known as Aghbolagh Aghdagh, Āq Bolagh, Āq Bolāgh, Aqbolāgh Dāgh, and Āq Būlāq) is a village in Shirin Su Rural District, Shirin Su District, Kabudarahang County, Hamadan Province, Iran. At the 2016 census, its population was 1,433, in 315 families.

References 

Populated places in Kabudarahang County